Shannon Golds (born 3 October 1986 in Gold Coast) is an Australian retired professional tennis player.

Golds has a career high WTA singles ranking of 203, achieved on 10 May 2010. Golds also has a career high WTA doubles ranking of 202 achieved on 7 December 2009. Golds has won 2 ITF singles titles and 6 ITF doubles titles.

Golds retired from tennis 2016.

ITF finals (8–3)

Singles (2–1)

Doubles (6–2)

References

External links
 
 
 
 Golds wins Hope Island Singles Title 2006

1986 births
Living people
Australian female tennis players
Tennis people from the Gold Coast